The 2015–16 Saint Louis Billikens women's basketball team will represent the Saint Louis University during the 2015–16 college basketball season. The Billikens, led by fourth year head coach Lisa Stone. The Billikens were members of the Atlantic 10 Conference and play their home games at the Chaifetz Arena. They finished the season 26–8, 13–3 in A-10 play to share the A-10 regular season title with Duquesne and George Washington. They advanced to the semifinals of the A-10 women's tournament where they lost to Duquesne. They were invited to the Women's National Invitation Tournament where defeated Arkansas–Little Rock and Ball State in the first and second round before losing to WKU in the third round.

2015–16 media
All non-televised Billikens home games and conference road games will stream on the A-10 Digital Network.

Roster

Schedule

|-
!colspan=9 style="background:#0000CC; color:#FFFFFF;"| Exhibition

|-
!colspan=9 style="background:#0000CC; color:#FFFFFF;"| Non-conference regular season

|-
!colspan=9 style="background:#0000CC; color:#FFFFFF;"| Atlantic 10 regular season

|-
!colspan=9 style="background:#0000FF; color:#FFFFFF;"| Atlantic 10 Tournament

|-
!colspan=9 style="background:#0000FF; color:#FFFFFF;"| WNIT

Rankings
2015–16 NCAA Division I women's basketball rankings

See also
 2015–16 Saint Louis Billikens men's basketball team

References

Saint Louis
Saint Louis Billikens women's basketball seasons
2016 Women's National Invitation Tournament participants